Marrocco is a surname. Notable people with the surname include:

Brendan Marrocco, American soldier
Frank Marrocco, Canadian judge
Léna Marrocco (born 1995), French figure skater
Marcello Marrocco (born 1969), Italian footballer
 (born 1946), Italian singer